Suzuki is the second studio album by Austrian duo Tosca, released by Studio !K7 and G-Stone Recordings in 2000. Unlike many of Tosca's subsequent releases, Suzuki is essentially an instrumental album, with vocal samples integrated throughout, but in such a way that they "become a part of the instrumentation."

The album is dedicated to the Zen master Shunryu Suzuki. The dedication can be found on the inside of the front cover.

A dub remix album, Suzuki In Dub, was released in October of the same year, and the compilation of remixes of "Honey", Different Tastes of Honey, was released in 2002.

It was awarded a gold certification from the Independent Music Companies Association which indicated sales of at least 100,000 copies throughout Europe.

Track listing 

 "Pearl In"
 "Suzuki"
 "Annanas"
 "Orozco"
 "Busenfreund"
 "Honey"
 "Boss On the Boat"
 "John Tomes"
 "Ocean Beat"
 "The Key"
 "Doris Dub"
 "Pearl Off"

Personnel

 Richard Dorfmeister
 Rupert Huber
 Anna Clementi, Mike Daliot - Vocals
 Bo Kondren - Mastering

References

2000 albums
Tosca (band) albums